The Bucharest Metropolitan Area (Romanian: Zona Metropolitană București) is a metropolitan area project formally established since 2016 that includes Bucharest, the capital city of Romania, and surrounding communes. If completed, it would have a population of about 2.3 million, only slightly larger than that of the city proper (1.9 million). It would also be a member of the METREX network.

According to Eurostat, Bucharest has a functional urban area of 2,412,530 residents.

History
The "Metropolitan Area" project has been initiated in 2003. A survey in 2008 showed that about 70% of the population of the area favors the project. The city proper has now 228 km2, but the metropolitan zone would reach 1,800 km2 in a first phase. A possible name for it will probably be "Greater  Bucharest".

In an initial stage, the zone would include Bucharest and Ilfov County. Then, there are several plans to further increase the "Metropolitan Area of Bucharest" to about 20 times the area of the city proper (from  228 km² to 5,046 km²). It would include 6 cities and 87 communes from the Ilfov, Giurgiu  and Călărași counties, and would extend all the way towards the border with Bulgaria in the south, and towards the Prahova County in the north. In an intermediate stage, the extension of the zone would include 62 out of the proposed 93 candidate localities. The "Bucharest Metropolitan Area" may become the biggest port on the Danube upon completion of the Danube–Bucharest Canal.

The enlarged "Metropolitan Area" Council will have 105 councilors, twice as many are now, and the Government will appoint a governor, a position which would be homologized to the prefect of Bucharest.

Subdivisions

References

External links
 springerlink.com
  "Metropolitan Zone of Bucharest will be ready in 10 years"
  "Official site of Metropolitan Zone of Bucharest Project"
 9am.ro
 wall-street.ro
 romanialibera.ro
 The Bucharest Metropolitan Area (PDF)

Metropolitan area
Metropolitan areas of Romania